John Madison Wever (February 24, 1847 – September 27, 1914) was a U.S. Representative from New York.

Biography
Wever was born in Ganges Township, Michigan. He attended the common schools and Albion College. During the Civil War he entered the Union Army at the age of sixteen and served in the Army of the Cumberland and the Army of the Ohio. At the close of the war, he settled in Plattsburgh, New York, and engaged in banking. He was elected the county treasurer of Clinton County in 1884 and reelected in 1887.

Wever was elected as a Republican to the Fifty-second and Fifty-third Congresses, serving from March 4, 1891, to March 3, 1895. He was not a candidate for renomination in 1894 to the Fifty-fourth Congress.

He was cashier and later president of the Merchants’ National Bank of Plattsburgh. He died in Plattsburgh and is buried there in Riverside Cemetery.

References

External links
 Retrieved on 2008-02-14

1847 births
1914 deaths
Politicians from Plattsburgh, New York
American bankers
Union Army soldiers
Albion College alumni
Republican Party members of the United States House of Representatives from New York (state)
19th-century American politicians
19th-century American businesspeople